The Oklahoma Flying Aces were a professional indoor football team based in Enid, Oklahoma, and members of the Champions Indoor Football league.  The team was founded in 2018 as an expansion franchise for the 2019 season. The team was dormant for the 2021 season, but did not return in for the 2022 season. The Flying Aces' home games were played at Stride Bank Center.

History
The franchise was announced by Champions Indoor Football (CIF) in 2018 as a 2019 expansion team and selected the name "Flying Aces" from a name-the-team contest in October 2018. They finished their inaugural season with a 2–10 record, with their only wins a forfeit over the folded Texas Revolution and a semi-professional team, the NTX Savages, that filled in for the home game originally scheduled against the Revolution. The team's second season was cancelled before it could begin due to the COVID-19 pandemic. On April 1, 2021, the team withdrew from the 2021 season one week before it was scheduled for its first game citing a drastically increased workers' compensation insurance from $5000 in 2019 to $150000 for 2021. The team was replaced on the CIF schedule by a re-launched Dodge City Law with law inheriting the Flying Aces' roster and staff.

The Flying Aces were not included in the 2022 schedule and appears to have suspended operations.

References

External links
Oklahoma Flying Aces official website

American football teams in Oklahoma
Champions Indoor Football teams
American football teams established in 2018
2018 establishments in Oklahoma
Enid, Oklahoma